Sanders Creek is a stream in the U.S. state of Iowa. It is a tributary to Rapid Creek.

Sanders Creek was named after Cyrus Sanders, a pioneer settler.

References

Rivers of Johnson County, Iowa
Rivers of Iowa